Pogonachne is a genus of Indian plants in the grass family. The only known species is Pogonachne racemosa, native to Maharashtra.

References

Andropogoneae
Monotypic Poaceae genera
Endemic flora of India (region)
Grasses of India
Flora of Maharashtra